Paronymus nevea, the scarce largest dart, is a butterfly in the family Hesperiidae. The species was first described by Hamilton Herbert Druce in 1910. It is found in Guinea, Ghana, Nigeria, Cameroon, the Central African Republic, the eastern part of the Democratic Republic of the Congo and north-western Zambia. The habitat consists of primary forests.

References

Butterflies described in 1910
Erionotini